Raj Kumar Bagri, Baron Bagri,  (24 August 1930 – 26 April 2017) was an Indian-born British businessman and a Conservative member of the House of Lords from 1997 to 2010. He was made a life peer in 1997 under the title Baron Bagri, of Regent's Park in the City of Westminster.

Early life
Raj Kumar Bagri was born on 24 August 1930 in Calcutta (now Kolkata) into a middle-class family. His father died when he was three, and age 15, his mother sent him to work as a clerk at for a metal distributor, part of the Binani family's industrial empire.

Career

A businessman, Bagri was chairman of the London Metal Exchange until 2002. Bagri was a member of the advisory committee of The Prince's Trust and chairman of the Bagri Foundation. He was a governor of the University of London's School of Oriental and African Studies (SOAS).

In 2012, Bagri sold Hanover Lodge, "the UK’s most expensive home", to Andrey Goncharenko a Russian billionaire, for £120 million.

Personal life
He was born in a Maheshwari Banias (traders) caste  
in Bagri tribe of India. He married Usha Maheshwary in 1954 and they had son Apurv, who took over the running of Metdist, and daughter Amita Birla.

Bagri died in London on 26 April 2017.

Honours and arms

Honours
He was to the Order of the British Empire as a Commander (CBE) in the 1995 New Year Honours. The 1997 New Year Honours list announced that Bagri was to be raised to the peerage, and in February he was gazetted a life peer as Baron Bagri, of Regent's Park in the City of Westminster. In 2010, following the enactment of the Constitutional Reform and Governance Act, Bagri gave up his seat in the House of Lords in order to maintain his non-domiciled status for United Kingdom tax purposes.

Coat of arms

Notes

1930 births
2017 deaths
Rajasthani people
Conservative Party (UK) life peers
Indian peers
Commanders of the Order of the British Empire
British politicians of Indian descent
Bagrei, Rja
British businesspeople of Indian descent
People with non-domiciled status in the United Kingdom
Businesspeople from Kolkata
Life peers created by Elizabeth II